The Captain Robert S. Craig Cottage, also known as Bay Breeze, is a historic building located in Ocean City, Worcester County, Maryland, United States. It is a simple 1½-story rectangular frame structure with a gable roof. The full-width front porch is capped with an open X-cross balustrade. A two-bedroom rental apartment was added to the rear of the house around 1964. About the same time a tool shed that originally stood on a lot at Thirteenth and Philadelphia Avenue was moved to this location and converted into an efficiency rental apartment.

The significance of this house is its association with Captain Robert S. Craig who developed and led the Ocean City Beach Patrol (OCBP), the local lifeguard organization. For nearly three decades this building served as its headquarters and a residence for summer lifeguards. It was designed by Craig and built from 1949 to 1950. His son Robert designed the rear addition and had the tool shed moved here. During the time the building served the OCBP, the organization became known across the country for its management and ocean rescue operation. It was Craig who had the lifeguards utilize semaphore communications among themselves and integrated innovative rescue technology. The building was listed on the National Register of Historic Places in 2017.

References

External links

Houses completed in 1950
Ocean City, Maryland
National Register of Historic Places in Worcester County, Maryland
Houses on the National Register of Historic Places in Maryland
Houses in Worcester County, Maryland